Necydalopsini is a tribe of beetles in the subfamily Cerambycinae, containing the following genera:

 Abaiba
 Austronecydalopsis
 Eucharassus
 Lissozodes
 Necydalopsis
 Ozodes
 Parepimelitta
 Piruapsis
 Saltanecydalopsis
 Sthelenus

References

 
Cerambycinae